Mary Bullman Sands (April 8, 1872 – April 2, 1949), from Allanstand in Madison County, North Carolina, was a singer of old traditional ballads during the early part of the 20th century. She was known locally as "Singing Mary" due to her singing talent and extensive knowledge of the words and melodies of many old-time traditional songs that had been passed down through previous generations. In 1916, English folklorist Cecil Sharp visited Madison County to collect and record traditional folk songs being sung in America that would have originated generations earlier in the British Isles. Sands sang 25 songs for him, 23 of which he included in his book, English Folk Songs from the Southern Appalachians.

Early life and family
Mary Sands née Bullman was born on April 8, 1872, in the Laurel section of Madison County, North Carolina. Her parents were John Wesley Bullman (1847–1895) and Rosannah Shelton (aka Franklin) (1836–1909). She had a twin sister, Martha Bullman (1872–1897), who died while in her twenties. She also had an older sister, Melvina ("Jane") Bullman (c. 1865 – c. 1930) and an older brother, Christopher Columbus ("Sonny") Bullman (1869–1935). John Wesley Bullman (called "Wesley") was the second husband of Rosannah. Her first husband, Hugh Wallin (1826–1864), was killed in the U.S. Civil War. Rosannah and Hugh Wallin had five sons – Sands's half brothers – some of whom also became well-known traditional ballad singers.

In 1892, Mary Bullman married James Monroe Sands (1849–1923), who had moved to Madison County from Danville, Virginia. Together they had ten children, none of whom are currently living.

Cecil Sharp
When Cecil Sharp came to Madison County in 1916 as part of his project to collect old English ballads, Sands was 44 years old and was eight and a half months pregnant with her tenth child. Of the 39 different Madison County singers that sang for Sharp, Sands provided him the second largest number of songs, 25, with Jane Hicks Gentry of Hot Springs, North Carolina providing him the most, a total of 70, 40 of which were published in his book English Folk Songs from the Southern Appalachians. After Sharp's visit, Sands continued to sing, became very active in her church and wrote a number of unpublished religious songs. She was a lifelong resident of Madison County, except for brief stays with her children during the latter part of her life as her health began to fail.

Death
Sands died April 2, 1949, due to complications following a stroke, just a few days short of her 77th birthday. She was buried in the Walnut Methodist Church Cemetery, Walnut, North Carolina.

Songs collected by Sharp
This list includes dates, titles, and volume and page references to the second and enlarged edition (two volumes-in-one) of Sharp's English Folk Songs from the Southern Appalachians, published in 1932.

(In some cases, Sands referred to her songs by titles different from their more common titles, and parenthetical entries indicate the titles Sharp used in his book.)

July 31, 1916
The Silk Merchant's Daughter, I, 381
The Perbadus Lady (Pretty Nancy of Yarmouth), I, 379
The Brown Girl, I, 295
Lord Bateman (Young Beichan), I, 81
Fair Margaret and Sweet William, I, 135
Come You People Old and Young (The Suffolk Miracle), I, 261

August 1, 1916
Awake! Awake!, I, 358
Little Soldier Boy (The Lady and the Dragoon), I, 333
The Daemon Lover, I, 244
Earl Brand, I, 16
I Am a Man of Honour (The Virginian Lover), unpublished
The Broken Token, II, 70

August 2, 1916
The Outlandish Knight (Lady Isabel and the Elf Knight), I, 5
The Golden Glove, I, 377

August 3, 1916
Lord Lovell, I, 146
Married and Single Life, II, 3
My Sad Overthrow (The Sheffield Apprentice), II, 66
Lord Randal, I, 38

August 4, 1916
Polly Oliver, I, 344
I Waited Out My Hours, unpublished
The Boatsman and the Chest, I, 338
If You Want to Go A-courting, II, 6

August 5, 1916
Pretty Saro, II, 10
Lord Thomas and Fair Ellender (Lord Thomas and Fair Ellinor), I, 121
My Dearest Dear, II, 13

Present-day singers
The old ballads collected by Sharp from Sands and others over a century ago have not been forgotten. A number of present-day traditional ballad singers have included Sands's songs in their repertoires for live concerts as well as in sound recordings.

Sheila Kay Adams, award-winning singer, musician, story teller, and author, has recorded an album entitled My Dearest Dear, which includes six songs that are part of Sharp's collection from Sands. They are: "Fine Sally" (aka "The Brown Girl"), "Awake! Awake!," "My Dearest Dear," "Little Soldier Boy," "Silk Merchant's Daughter," and "Jimmy Randall" (aka "Lord Randall").

Joe Penland, ballad singer and story teller, has recorded several albums that include songs from Sands, with his most recent album, The Mary Sands Project, Volume I, containing eleven of the songs Sands sang for Sharp and one original song written by Sands. They are: "Awake! Awake!," "The Silk Merchants Daughter," "Sweet William (Earl Brand)," "The House Carpenter (The Daemon Lover)," "My Sad Overthrow (The Sheffield Apprentice)," "The Handkerchief (The Suffolk Miracle)," "Lady Marget (Fair Margaret and Sweet William)," "The Boatsman and the Chest," "Lord Thomas and Fair Ellender," "Lady Isabel and the Elf Knight," "Jimmy Randall (Lord Randall)," and "Your Sins Will Find You Out." "Your Sins Will Find You Out" was written by Sands depicting the 1937 shooting death of her son Chesley in Marshall, North Carolina.

Prior to the release of The Mary Sands Project, Volume I, Penland had recorded two other albums that included songs from Sands. They are: Standing on Tradition, which includes "Pretty Saro," and On Shakey Ground, which includes "My Dearest Dear" and "Fine Sally" (aka "The Brown Girl").

Other traditional Southern Appalachian ballad singers who have recorded albums containing one or more of Sands's songs include: Donna Ray Norton, Single Girl and Forks in the Road; Bobby McMillon, A Deeper Feeling; Bill Morris, Blue Ridge Mountain Music, Volume II; Jerry Adams, When I First Come to this Country; Doug and Jack Wallin, Family Songs and Stories from the North Carolina Mountains; and Betty Smith, Songs Traditionally Sung in North Carolina.

References

1872 births
1949 deaths
People from Madison County, North Carolina
American folk singers
Musicians from Appalachia